Halıcı or Halici is a Turkish surname. It is derived from the Turkish noun of Persian origin halı (cf.  (qâli)) with the meaning "carpet" by adding the Turkish agentive suffix -cı and originally denoted a person either weaving or selling carpets or rugs. Notable people with the surname include:
 Mehdi Halıcı (1927–2008), Turkish novelist
 Nevin Halıcı (born 1941), Turkish writer

References

External links 

Turkish-language surnames
Occupational surnames